Song of Paris  is a 1952 British comedy film directed by John Guillermin and starring Dennis Price, Anne Vernon and Hermione Baddeley. It was shot at Walton Studios outside London. It was distributed in the United States by Lippert Pictures as Bachelor in Paris.

Premise
An English businessman travels to Paris and becomes involved with a cabaret star.

Cast

Production
Adelphi invested £17,490 of the budget.

Critical reception
Amongst contemporary reviews, the News of the World wrote "Pretty blondes suddenly lose their skirts and pompous aristocrats are deprived of their pants. Such fun!" whereas Variety thought it "completely unsubtle in its approach;" and more recently, TV Guide concluded "Auer's antics provide most of the laughs in this tame effort," and rated it 2/5 stars.

References

External links

Song of Paris at Letterbox DVD

1952 films
Films directed by John Guillermin
British comedy films
1952 comedy films
British black-and-white films
Films set in Paris
Films shot at Nettlefold Studios
1950s English-language films
1950s British films